Torsten Andersson  (December 9, 1909 – March 11, 1978) was a Swedish politician. He was a member of the Centre Party and a member of the Swedish parliament 1953-1956 (lower house) and 1957-1968 (upper house). He was county governor of Gotland County 1968–1974.

Members of the Riksdag from the Centre Party (Sweden)
1909 births
1978 deaths
Members of the Första kammaren
Members of the Andra kammaren
People from Borås
Governors of Gotland
20th-century Swedish politicians